Bibikovo is a rural locality (a selo) in Sergeyevsky Selsoviet of Blagoveshchensky District, Amur Oblast, Russia. The population was 175 as of 2018. There are 2 streets.

Geography 
Bibikovo is located on the left bank of the Amur River, 75 km north of Blagoveshchensk (the district's administrative centre) by road. Sergeyevka is the nearest rural locality.

References 

Rural localities in Blagoveshchensky District, Amur Oblast